Robert Michael Doran  (20 June 1939 – 21 January 2021) was an American-Canadian Jesuit priest, and theologian, and Emmett Doerr Chair in Catholic Systematic Theology at Marquette University. He was known for his research on the works of the Jesuit theologian and philosopher Bernard Lonergan.

References

External links
Robert M. Doran at Marquette University

1939 births
2021 deaths
20th-century Canadian male writers
20th-century American Jesuits
20th-century Canadian philosophers
20th-century American Roman Catholic theologians
Canadian philosophers
Canadian Roman Catholic theologians
Jesuit philosophers
Jesuit theologians
Lonergan scholars
Marquette University alumni
Marquette University faculty
Systematic theologians
Academic staff of the University of Toronto
Writers from Milwaukee